Lublin is a village in Taylor County, Wisconsin, United States. The population was 118 at the 2010 census.

History
The village is named after the city of Lublin in southeast Poland. Marvin Durski, a Chicago land agent who sold real estate in the area, came from that Polish city.

Geography
Lublin is located at  (45.0751, -90.7242), along the North Fork Eau Claire River near its headwaters.

Demographics

2010 census
As of the census of 2010, there were 118 people, 57 households, and 30 families living in the village. The racial makeup of the village was 98.3% White, 0.8% Asian, and 0.8% from other races. Hispanic or Latino of any race were 0.8% of the population.

There were 57 households, of which 17.5% had children under the age of 18 living with them, 40.4% were married couples living together, 5.3% had a female householder with no husband present, 7.0% had a male householder with no wife present, and 47.4% were non-families. 40.4% of all households were made up of individuals, and 17.6% had someone living alone who was 65 years of age or older. The average household size was 2.07 and the average family size was 2.70.

The median age in the village was 49 years. 16.9% of residents were under the age of 18; 5.1% were between the ages of 18 and 24; 16.9% were from 25 to 44; 34.8% were from 45 to 64; and 26.3% were 65 years of age or older. The gender makeup of the village was 57.6% male and 42.4% female.

2000 census
As of the census of 2000, there were 110 people, 59 households, and 32 families living in the village. The population density was 72.5 people per square mile (27.9/km2). There were 72 housing units at an average density of 47.5 per square mile (18.3/km2). The racial makeup of the village was 100.00% White.

There were 59 households, out of which 11.9% had children under the age of 18 living with them, 44.1% were married couples living together, 8.5% had a female householder with no husband present, and 44.1% were non-families. 42.4% of all households were made up of individuals, and 18.6% had someone living alone who was 65 years of age or older. The average household size was 1.86 and the average family size was 2.45.

In the village, the population was spread out, with 13.6% under the age of 18, 5.5% from 18 to 24, 23.6% from 25 to 44, 31.8% from 45 to 64, and 25.5% who were 65 years of age or older. The median age was 49 years. For every 100 females, there were 96.4 males. For every 100 females age 18 and over, there were 82.7 males.

The median income for a household in the village was $20,938, and the median income for a family was $50,625. Males had a median income of $28,750 versus $23,750 for females. The per capita income for the village was $15,823. There were 24.1% of families and 27.2% of the population living below the poverty line, including 16.7% of under eighteens and 56.5% of those over 64.

Notable person
Joseph Sweda, Wisconsin State Representative and farmer, was born in Lublin.

References

External links
 Village of Lublin, Wisconsin government website

Villages in Taylor County, Wisconsin
Villages in Wisconsin